The 26th International 500-Mile Sweepstakes Race was held at the Indianapolis Motor Speedway on Monday, May 30, 1938. For 1938, riding mechanics were made optional; however, no teams utilized them in the race. In addition, after seven years, the engine specifications were changed again. The 1930 "Junk" formula was eliminated. Normally aspirated engines were allowed 4.5 liters (down from 6.0 L), and superchargers would be permitted again, with a maximum displacement of 3.0 liters. Any fuel was allowed, which directly affected the race.

Time trials
Ten-lap (25 mile) qualifying runs were utilized. This would be the final time this distance was used. Floyd Roberts won the pole position.

Race Recap
Floyd Roberts started in the pole position.

By 200 miles completed, Jimmy Snyder led a trio of alcohol-powered cars, followed by Roberts and Wilbur Shaw in cars running gasoline. When the alcohol cars pitted to re-fuel, Roberts took the lead for the first time. At 300 miles, Roberts made his one and only pit stop for fuel and a single tire change, and gave up the lead to Snyder. At 375 miles, Snyder made his 3rd stop for more methanol, and Roberts re-took a lead he would not relinquish to the checkered. 

Roberts led 92 laps, posted an average speed of 117.200 miles per hour, and won $32,075. Roberts' car was owned by Lou Moore, who was also the chief mechanic. 

For this race, only the front and back straightaways were still surfaced with the original bricks installed in 1909. All 4 turns were paved with asphalt prior to this race. 

The race was run under heavily overcast skies, with rain threatening the entire day. But it did not rain until the race was completed. 

The race was marred by the death of 33-year-old spectator Everett Spence. On lap 45 the number 42 car driven by Emil Andres hit the wall in turn two, then flipped over several times, causing its right front wheel to fly off. The wheel traveled  through the air and hit Spence, who was pronounced dead upon arriving at the hospital. Andres suffered a concussion, broken nose, and chest injuries.

Box score

Alternates
First alternate: Charlie Crawford

Failed to Qualify
Frankie Beeder  (#45)
Floyd Davis (#59)
Fred Frame (#32)
Ralph Hepburn (#4)
Deacon Litz (#52)
Tazio Nuvolari  (#48, #54)
Jack Petticord (#57)
Johnny Sawyer (#53)
Johnny Seymour (#56)
Doc Williams (#46)
Billy Winn (#18, #24)

See also
 1938 AAA Championship Car season

References

Indianapolis 500 races
Indianapolis 500
Indianapolis 500
1938 in American motorsport
May 1938 sports events